Judith Anne Arthy (born 12 November 1940 Brisbane, Australia) is an Australian actress, now retired, and writer. 
 
Judith Arthy began her theatrical career in a production of Arthur Miller's The Crucible with the Brisbane Repertory Theatre in July, 1957. From 1961 appearances in Sydney - initially in Alan Seymour's The One Day of the Year - and later in Melbourne, a successful run of The Fantasticks. Arthy appeared on Australian television from 1962 and made her cinematic debut in the 1966 Australian film They're a Weird Mob.

Arthy began an extended stay in the UK in 1966, inaugurating a series of British television credits with a guest spot on The Baron. Subsequent credits included Randall and Hopkirk (Deceased); episode 1 of the Lord Peter Wimsey (TV series), (Clouds of Witness); Masterpiece Theatre; and Z-Cars.

Arthy made her London West End stage debut in 1969  with William Douglas-Home's The Secretary Bird playing opposite Kenneth More at the Savoy Theatre, and later a further West End appearance with Eartha Kitt in Norman Krasna's Broadway comedy Bunny at the Criterion Theatre. Meanwhile, Arthy had participated in the 1970 season at the Chichester Festival Theatre appearing in Arms and the Man and Peer Gynt. Also for her were featuring roles in the films The Shuttered Room (1967) and Arthur? Arthur! (1969).
 
In 1975 Arthy resumed her stage and television career in Australia: her final apparent screen credit was the Australian television series Case For the Defense which ran in May and June 1978. Arthy subsequently taught secondary-school English and Drama in Brisbane. Her two novels are Goodbye Goldilocks (1984)  and  - for younger readers - The Children of Mirrabooka (1997).

Brisbane audiences saw her return to the stage in 2002 to La Boite Theatre in Peta Murray's Salt.
 
She married the Australian croquet champion and film-maker Aggy Read  and was with him at the time of his death on 22 August 1998.

References

External links

Judith Arthy, UK Film and TV appearances w/photos

1940 births
Living people
Australian expatriates in the United Kingdom
Australian television actresses
Actresses from Brisbane
Writers from Brisbane